Kensington is a constituency in Greater London which first existed between 1974 and 1997 and was recreated in 2010. Since 2019, it has been represented in the House of Commons of the UK Parliament by Felicity Buchan of the Conservative Party.

At the 2017 general election Emma Dent Coad gained the seat from incumbent Conservative Victoria Borwick by the slenderest margin in England, 20 votes, the first time Kensington had been represented by a Labour MP. Dent Coad was defeated by Buchan at the 2019 United Kingdom general election by the narrow margin of 150 votes.

Kensington is known as the wealthiest Parliamentary electoral division in the whole of the United Kingdom.

Boundaries

The constituency formed for the 2010 election comprises the northern and central parts of the Royal Borough of Kensington and Chelsea in and around Kensington and aligns similarly with the boundary of the Royal Borough of Kensington prior to its merger with the Metropolitan Borough of Chelsea. It has the electoral wards:

Abingdon, Brompton, Campden, Colville, Courtfield, Earls Court, Golborne, Holland, Norland, Notting Dale, Pembridge, Queen's Gate, and St Helens

From 1974 to 1983 the constituency comprised the electoral wards:

Golborne, Holland, Norland, Pembridge, Queen's Gate and St Charles.

From 1983 to 1997 the constituency comprised the electoral wards:

Avondale, Campden, Colville, Golborne, Holland, Kelfield, Norland, Pembridge, Queen's Gate and St Charles.

History

First creation
The first incarnation of a Kensington constituency in Westminster was for the February 1974 general election, derived from the fairly safe Labour seat of Kensington North, and the overwhelmingly Conservative Kensington South; this was abolished for the 1997 general election. The seat was mostly replaced by Regent's Park and Kensington North which until its 2010 abolition was represented by Labour MPs, being won twice during the Blair Ministry, and was partly replaced by Kensington and Chelsea which was held by Malcolm Rifkind (Conservative) until his resignation at the 2015 general election.
Summary of results (first creation)
The old seat returned Conservative MPs from 1974 up to and including its last general election in 1992. At its sole by-election in 1988 the seat was won by its smallest majority, a highly marginal 3.4% – a by-election which saw a majority turnout and a Labour splinter party candidate, for the Social Democratic Party (UK, 1988) achieve fourth place attracting 5% of the vote yet standing in the year of the formal amalgamation of the main SDP splinter group with the Liberal Party to form the Liberal Democrats who stood as the Social and Liberal Democrats and seven years after the formation of the official SDP-Liberal Alliance.

Second creation
The constituency was recreated by adopting the Fifth Periodic Review of Westminster constituencies of the Boundary Commission at the 2010 general election, combining elements of the two constituencies.
Summary of results (second creation)
The 2015 result was a narrower result than 2010, and gave the seat the 126th-most marginal majority of the Conservative Party's 331 seats by percentage of majority. The runner-up party remained the Labour Party and the Liberal Democrats' share of the vote fell by 13.9% to 5.6% of votes cast.

In the June 2017 election, three recounts occurred, the first two producing extremely close results with the latter producing a Labour majority of only 20+ votes. After the two recounts due to fatigue among the staff the counting was suspended to allow them to "rest and recuperate". The third recount gave Labour a majority of 20, the first time the constituency had become a Labour seat since its creation, and made it the Labour Party's most vulnerable seat.

Constituency profile
Kensington is mostly residential — housing varies between the expensive apartments with manicured garden squares or terraces of South Kensington, that has some of the most exclusive real estate in the world and, by contrast, North Kensington and Ladbroke Grove have, for the most part, dense social housing, tower blocks in output areas with high rankings in the 2000-compiled Index of Multiple Deprivation. Kensington High Street is an upmarket shopping hub, Kensington Palace is the residence of members of the Royal Family, and Kensington Palace Gardens is the site of many embassies and a few private residences of very affluent homeowners. South Kensington also borders Hyde Park and includes the Science Museum, the Natural History Museum and the Victoria and Albert.

Earls Court, Brompton, Holland Park and Notting Hill have their own characters. Earls Court is less affluent than its neighbours; while it is undergoing rapid gentrification and includes its own areas for the super-rich, there are still old hotels and bedsits around the site of the former Earls Court Exhibition Centre, which extends into the historically marginal Hammersmith constituency. Notting Hill is an affluent, highly cosmopolitan area which hosts the Notting Hill Carnival, led by the area's Afro-Caribbean community. It fell on hard times in the twentieth century, being associated with low-rent flats and multiple-occupancy homes, but has since been gentrified.

Members of Parliament

Election results

Elections in the 2010s

Kensington was the last constituency to be declared in the 2017 general election. The result was extremely close in Kensington, which had been considered a safe Conservative seat. After three counts on 8 and 9 June, which appeared to show Labour majorities of between 36 and 50, counting was suspended due to fatigue. The result was announced later on 9 June.

Elections in the 1990s

Elections in the 1980s

Elections in the 1970s

See also
List of parliamentary constituencies in London

Notes

References

External links 
Politics Resources (Election results from 1922 onwards)
Electoral Calculus (Election results from 1955 onwards)

Politics of the Royal Borough of Kensington and Chelsea
Parliamentary constituencies in London (historic)
Parliamentary constituencies in London
Constituencies of the Parliament of the United Kingdom established in 2010